Dalophia luluae is a species of amphisbaenian in the family Amphisbaenidae. The species is endemic to the Democratic Republic of the Congo.

Etymology
The specific name, luluae, refers to the Lulu River of the Democratic Republic of the Congo.

Reproduction
D. luluae is oviparous.

References

Further reading
De Witte G-F, Laurent RF (1942). "Contribution à la Systématique de Amphisbaenidae du Congo belge". Revue de zoologie et de botanique africaines 36: 67–86. (Monopeltis luluae, new species, p. 68). (in French).
Gans C (2005). "Checklist and Bibliography of the Amphisbaenia of the World". Bulletin of the American Museum of Natural History (289): 1–130. (''Dalophia luluae, p. 31).

Dalophia
Reptiles described in 1942
Taxa named by Gaston-François de Witte
Taxa named by Raymond Laurent
Endemic fauna of the Democratic Republic of the Congo
Reptiles of the Democratic Republic of the Congo